Vladislav Mykolaiovych Poliak  (born 10 August 1975, Vynohradiv, Zakarpattia Oblast, Ukraine) is a Ukrainian entrepreneur and politician. People's Deputy of Ukraine of the 9th convocation.

Biography 
Graduated from Vynohradiv Polytechnic College and Drohobych Ivan Franko State Pedagogical University (qualified as a manager-economist). Started his working career in the State Farm ‘Vynohradivskyi’. From 2009 – an entrepreneur.

Political activity  
Was a deputy of Vynohradiv City Council of the 6th convocation.
Deputy of Zakarpattia Oblast Council from the political ‘Revival’.
Vladislav Poliak worked as an assistant of people's deputy of Ukraine Ivan Bushko (12 December 2012 – 27 November 2014).
Was a candidate for people's deputies in the 2019 Ukrainian parliamentary election (electoral district No. 73, Berehove, Vynohradiv Raion, part of Berehove and Irshava Raions). Self-promoted. At the time of the election: an individual entrepreneur, non-party. Lives in Vynohradiv, Vynohradiv Raion, Zakarpattia Oblast.
In the parliamentary elections of 2019 was elected a People's Deputy of Ukraine of the 9th convocation.
Faction:  Dovira
Post:  Member of the Verkhovna Rada Committee on State Building, Local Governance, Regional and Urban Development.
Head of a group for inter-parliamentary relations with the Republic of Austria.
Head of a group for inter-parliamentary relations with Hungary.
Head of a group for inter-parliamentary relations with the Arab Republic of Egypt.
Head of a group for inter-parliamentary relations with Montenegro.
Head of a group for inter-parliamentary relations with the Slovak Republic.
Head of a group for inter-parliamentary relations with the Federal Republic of Germany.
Head of a group for inter-parliamentary relations with The Czech Republic.

Poliak and three other Dovira faction members (Valerii Lunchenko, Robert Khorvat and Vasyl Petiovka) developed the local Zakarpattia Oblast party Native Zakarpattia. This part won 12 of the 64 seats in the Zakarpattia Oblast Council during the 2020 Ukrainian local elections.

References

External links

1975 births
Living people
People from Vynohradiv
Ukrainian businesspeople
Ninth convocation members of the Verkhovna Rada
Revival (Ukraine) politicians
21st-century Ukrainian politicians